Toggle may refer to:
Toggle mechanism
Toggle switch
Toggling harpoon, an ancient weapon and tool used in whaling to impale a whale when thrown
A type of textile closure, like an elongated button
Toggle (Doonesbury character), a character in the comic strip Doonesbury
Feature toggle, a technique in software development
Cordlock toggle, for stopping a cord or drawstring. 
Toggle ropes, a piece of military equipment
Toggle bolt, a type of fastener
Toggle (website), a Singaporean entertainment website and OTT service since renamed to meWATCH